Fearsville is an unincorporated community in Christian County, Kentucky, United States. The community was named for the family of Carson Fears, a Christian County native.

References

Unincorporated communities in Kentucky
Unincorporated communities in Christian County, Kentucky